The Hôpital du Sacré-Cœur de Montréal is a hospital in the Cartierville neighbourhood of Montreal, Quebec, Canada, bordering on Saint-Laurent.

It is one of the largest teaching hospitals affiliated with the Université de Montréal, and one of the largest hospitals in Quebec. It is one of only three hospitals in the province with a Level 1 Trauma Center.

History
In downtown Montreal on June 1, 1898, the day of the Feast of the Sacred Heart, a group of women founded a small hospital named Hôpital du Sacré-Cœur de Montréal to care for a dozen ill individuals deemed the "incurables".

In 1902, the administration of the hospital was taken over by the Sisters of Providence, and a new building with 375 beds was built on Décarie Boulevard; it was known as Hôpital des Incurables. The building was destroyed by fire in March 1923, and in 1926 a new building was built on Gouin Boulevard in Cartierville, where it still stands today. With the new building, the administration reverted to using the original name, Hôpital du Sacré-Cœur de Montréal.

The new hospital was initially focused on the treatment of tuberculosis. Considered a sanatorium, it became an important teaching hospital for pulmonary illness. In 1931, Édouard Samson founded the orthopedics department, which eventually became the largest institution for training orthopedic surgeons in the province of Quebec.

In 1973, the Hôpital du Sacré-Coeur de Montréal was affiliated with the Université de Montréal as its medical and health-sciences teaching hospital. The Albert-Prévost Institute merged with the hospital to form a centre for psychiatric patients.

References

Notes

See also 
 Centre hospitalier universitaire de Montréal (CHUM)
 McGill University Health Centre
 Montreal General Hospital
 McGill University Faculty of Medicine
 Montreal Chest Institute
 Montreal Children's Hospital
 Montreal Neurological Institute
 Royal Victoria Hospital
 St. Mary's Hospital
 Jewish General Hospital

External links
 Hôpital du Sacré-Coeur de Montréal

Hospitals in Montreal
Hospital buildings completed in 1902
Hospital buildings completed in 1926
Teaching hospitals in Canada
Hospitals established in 1898
Heliports in Canada
Ahuntsic-Cartierville
Certified airports in Quebec
Université de Montréal